Ignacio González King (born 28 March 1980) is a former professional tennis player from Argentina.

Career
González King played only doubles on the ATP Tour. He and partner Enzo Artoni were runners-up in the 2005 Brasil Open and also made the semi-finals at Viña del Mar that year.

The Argentine player won eight doubles titles on the ATP Challenger circuit, all in the space of 15 months.

ATP career finals

Doubles: 1 (0–1)

Challenger titles

Singles: (1)

Doubles: (8)

Notes

References

External links
 
 

1980 births
Living people
Argentine people of English descent
Argentine male tennis players
Tennis players from Buenos Aires
21st-century Argentine people